True Traitor, True Whore  is a full-length album by San Francisco-based one-man black metal band Leviathan.

Jef Whitehead, aka Wrest, was arrested on January 9, 2011, on charges of sexual assault and domestic violence. Wrest has confirmed in an interview that the events surrounding his arrest and the accuser inspired the music and theme of True Traitor, True Whore. In May 2012, Wrest was found not guilty of all charges except for one count of aggravated domestic battery.

A cassette version of True Traitor, True Whore was released on Inferna Profundus, limited to 300 copies.

Critical reception
Chronicles of Chaos called the album "a personal document of rage which lives in the black metal tradition of ruminating feelings transferred into song." The Quietus called it "musically caustic and erratic."

Track listing

References

Leviathan (musical project) albums
2011 albums